This article details the fixtures and results of the Indonesia national football team in 2005.

Men's senior team

Fixtures and results

FIFA 'A' matches 

2005
2004–05 in Indonesian football
Indonesia